Linda Ty Casper (Malabon, 1931) is a Filipino writer. She is a recipient of the S.E.A. Write Award.

Life
Born as Belinda Ty in Malabon, Philippines in 1931, she spent the World War II years with her grandmother while her father worked in the Philippine National Railways, and her mother in the Bureau of Public Schools. Her grandmother told her innumerable  stories about the Filipino's struggle for independence, that later became the topics of her novels. Linda Ty Casper graduated valedictorian in the University of the Philippines, and later earned her Master's degree in Harvard University for International Law.  In 1956, she married Leonard Casper, a professor emeritus of Boston College who is also a critic of Philippine Literature. They have two daughters and reside in Massachusetts.

Her works include the historical novel DreamEden and the political novels Awaiting Trespass, Wings of Stone, A Small Party in a Garden, and Fortress in the Plaza. She has also published three collections of short stories which present a cross-section of Filipino society.

In 1992, Tides and Near Occasions of Love won the Philippine PEN short story prize; another at the UNESCO International Writers' Day, London; and the SEAWrite Award in Bangkok  "Triptych for a Ruined Altar" was in the Roll of Honor of The Best American Short Stories, 1977.

Her novel Awaiting Trespass which is about the politically sensitive theme of torture by the Marcos regime was published by Readers International of London. This work gained her major critical attention in the United States for the first time, and in Britain the novel was chosen as one of the five best works of fiction by a woman writer published in 1985–86. .

Published works

The Transparent Sun (short stories), Peso Books, 1963
The Peninsulares (historical novel), Bookmark 1964
The Secret Runner (short stories), Florentino/National Book, 1974
 The Three-Cornered Sun (historical novel), New Day, 1974
Dread Empire (novella), Hong Kong, Heinemann, 1980
Hazards of Distance (novella), New Day, 1981
Fortress in the Plaza (novella), New Day, 1985
Awaiting Trespass (novella), London, Readers International, 1985
Wings of Stone (novella), London, Readers International, 1986
Ten Thousand Seeds (historical novel), Ateneo, 1987
A Small Party in a Garden (novella), New Day, 1988
Common Continent (short stories), Ateneo, 1991
Kulasyon: Uninterrupted Vigils (collected first chapters), Giraffe, 1995
DreamEden (historical novel) Ateneo 1996 and University of Washington Press 1997
A River, One-Woman Deep: Stories (novella and short stories), PALH (Philippine American Literary House), 2017; University of Santo Tomas Publishing House, 2018
Will You Happen, Past the Silence, Through the Dark?: Remembering Leonard Ralph Casper (biography), PALH (Philippine American Literary House), 2022

Awards
Djerassi, 1984
Filipino-American Women Network Award for Literature, 1985
Massachusetts Artists Foundation, 1988
Wheatland, 1990
UNESCO/P.E.N. Short Story, 1993
SEA Write Award, Bangkok, 1993
Bellagio, 1994

References

Sources
 Grow, L. M. "Ty-Casper (1931-)".The Greenwood Encyclopedia of Asian American Literature. Ed. Guiyou Huang. Westport, Connecticut: Greenwood Press, 2009, 937-940.

External links
PALH-EZINE, Short story and Interview
Reinterpretation of the American Dream, an article by Linda Ty Casper
Abstract by CSEAS University of Michigan
Boston Review, A Story by Linda Ty Casper

1931 births
Casper, Lind Ty
Casper, Lind Ty
English-language writers from the Philippines
Filipino writers
Casper, Lind Ty
Casper, Lind Ty
Casper, Lind Ty
Filipino emigrants to the United States
University of the Philippines alumni
Harvard Law School alumni
21st-century American women